Oligoporus is a genus of fungi in the family Polyporaceae. The genus was circumscribed by German mycologist Julius Oscar Brefeld in 1888 with Oligoporus farinosus as the type. This species is currently known as Postia rennyi.

Oligoporus species have fruit bodies that are either crust-like or pileate (i.e., with a cap). Species cause a brown rot of wood. The hyphal structure is monomytic, meaning that only generative hyphae are produced. Spores made by Oligoporus fungi are ellipsoid or have a short cylindrical shape.

Species
 Oligoporus alni (Niemelä & Vampola) Piatek (2003) – Europe
 Oligoporus balsaminus (Niemelä & Y.C.Dai) Niemelä (2005) – Eurasia
 Oligoporus bambusicola (Corner) T.Hatt. (2002)
 Oligoporus cretaceitextus (Corner) T.Hatt. (2002)
 Oligoporus davidiae (M. Pieri & B. Rivoire) Niemelä (2009)
 Oligoporus dissectus (Cooke) Huckfeldt & O.Schmidt (2017)
 Oligoporus friesii Falck & O.Falck (1937)
 Oligoporus hydnoidea G.Gaarder & Ryvarden (2003)
 Oligoporus perplexus (Corner) T.Hatt. (2001)
 Oligoporus persicinus (Niemelä & Y.C.Dai) Niemelä (2005) – Europe
 Oligoporus romellii (M.Pieri & B.Rivoire) Niemelä (2009) – Finland
 Oligoporus subfragilis (Corner) T.Hatt. (2003)
 Oligoporus wakefieldiae (Kotl. & Pouzar) L.Ryvarden & Melo (2014)

References

External links
 

Wood-decay fungi
Fomitopsidaceae
Polyporales genera
Taxa described in 1888
Taxa named by Julius Oscar Brefeld